Huntersville is an unincorporated community in Hardin County, in the U.S. state of Ohio.

History
Huntersville was laid out in 1836, and named for Jabas Hunter, a pioneer settler. A post office was established at Huntersville in 1839, and remained in operation until 1875.

References

Unincorporated communities in Hardin County, Ohio
1836 establishments in Ohio
Populated places established in 1836
Unincorporated communities in Ohio